The 1960 World Men's Military Cup was the fifteenth edition of the World Military Cup, the football military championship of the world. It was hosted by Oran, French Algeria. The format of competition was a championship in the final tournament.

Qualification

Qualification stage

Group A 

  qualified for the final tournament

Group B 

  qualified for the final tournament

Group C 

  qualified for the final tournament

Group D 

  qualified for the final tournament

Qualified teams

Final Tournament

Venues 
The tournament was held in Stade Henri Fouques-Duparc. With a capacity of 40 000 spectators, it was at this time the biggest stadium of the French Algeria. Now it's called Stade Ahmed Zabana.

Results

Champion

References

External links 
 1960 World Military Cup - rsssf.com

1960
World Military Cup
1960
1960
1960 in Algerian sport
Sport in Oran